St. Columba's Church, St. Kolumba and similar names may refer to churches dedicated to a saint Columba, hoverever, there are several.

Ireland
St Columba's Church, Aghancarnan, County Offaly
St Columba's Church, Ballybought, County Offaly
St Columba's Church, Burtonport, County Donegal
St Columba's Church, Ennis, County Clare
St Columba's Church, Glenswilly, County Donegal
St Columba's Church, Greenan, County Wicklow
St Columba's Church, Moyhill, County Meath

United Kingdom
St Columba's Church, Edinburgh (disambiguation)
St Columba's Catholic Church, Glasgow
St Columba's Church, Aignish, Western Isles (disused)
St Columba's Church, Cambridge
St Columba's Church, Canna, Inner Hebrides
St Columba's Church, Chester, Cheshire
St Columba's Church, London
St Columba's Church, Long Tower, Northern Ireland
St Columba's Church, Warcop, Cumbria
St Columba's Church of Scotland, Glasgow
St Columba's United Reformed Church, Oxford

United States
St. Columba's Church, Newark, New Jersey
St. Columba's Church (Hopewell Junction, New York)

Others
 St. Columba's Chapel (Middletown, Rhode Island)
 St. Columba's Cathedral, Oban, Scotland
 St. Kolumba, Cologne, Germany